"Light Up the Sky" is the first and only single from Yellowcard's album Paper Walls. The live acoustic version was first heard on March 30, 2007, at their concert at the Troubador in West Hollywood, California. It was then played electric in later shows. On May 15, 2007, the fully mixed album version was put on their Myspace page. The song impacted radio on June 5, 2007. It was released on iTunes on June 5, 2007, and it was the most added single to US Alternative/Modern Rock radio stations for the week ending June 8, 2007, and peaked at number 41 on the Billboard Modern Rock Tracks chart. The song also reached number 32 on the Adult Top 40 chart.

Music video
The video, directed by Lisa Mann, premiered on Yahoo! Music on July 10, 2007. It shows the band playing in a dark abandoned wasteland. However, as the song continues, an orange rain starts and makes the sky above bright for people who live in the gloomy world, bringing life into
something that was once desolate and dark.

Charts

References

External links

2007 singles
Yellowcard songs
Capitol Records singles
2007 songs
Song recordings produced by Neal Avron
Songs written by Ryan Key